Collin Kelbrick (born 28 October 1951) is a South African former cricketer. He played in fourteen first-class and three List A matches between 1977/78 and 1980/81.

See also
 List of Eastern Province representative cricketers

References

External links
 

1951 births
Living people
South African cricketers
Eastern Province cricketers
Griqualand West cricketers
People from Graaff-Reinet
Cricketers from the Eastern Cape